Ramziyeh-e Yek (also Romanized as Ramẕīyeh-e Yek, Ramzīyeh-ye Yek, and Ramzeyeh-ye Yek; also known as Ramzeyeh, Ramzīyeh, Ramziyehé Yek, and Ramzīyyeh) is a village in Esmailiyeh Rural District, in the Central District of Ahvaz County, Khuzestan Province, Iran. At the 2006 census, its population was 182, in 32 families.

References 

Populated places in Ahvaz County